In Cold Blood is a 1967 film score for the film In Cold Blood, composed, arranged and conducted by Quincy Jones. The soundtrack album was released on the Colgems label in 1967.

Truman Capote lobbied unsuccessfully to have Jones removed from the film. According to Jones, Capote called director Richard Brooks and said "Richard, I don't understand why you've got a Negro doing the music for a film with no people of color in it.' And Richard Brooks said, 'Fuck you, he's doing the music". Capote later apologized to Jones.

The Vinyl Factory said "The opening title track, with its galloping drums and corrosive strings, lets you know you are entering a bleak musical terrain. "Perry's Theme", which begins with a beatific Spanish guitar, mutates into something terrifying, as strings rise and fall ominously. With its harrowing organ blasts, "Murder Scene" is a haunting aural crime photo. At the time, this menacing soundtrack was considered a convention breaker not only for Jones, but also for black composers in Hollywood".

Track listing
All compositions by Quincy Jones
 "In Cold Blood" – 2:48
 "Clutter Family Theme" – 2:03
 "Hangin' Paper" – 2:10
 "Down Clutter's Lane" – 2:43
 "Seduction" – 2:35
 "Perry's Theme" – 3:20
 "Lonely Bottles" – 2:34
 "No Witnesses" – 2:13
 "I'll Have to Kill You" – 2:25
 "Nina" (Lyrics by Gil Bernal) – 3:56
 "Murder Scene" – 2:02
 "The Corner" – 2:52

Personnel
 Orchestra arranged and conducted by Quincy Jones
Gil Bernal − vocals (track 10)
Buddy Childers − trumpet
Frank Rosolino − trombone
Dave Grusin − clavinet
 Gene Cipriano, Bud Shank, William Green − woodwinds
Howard Roberts − guitar
Ray Brown, Andy Simpkins − bass
Carol Kaye − electric bass
Shelly Manne, Earl Palmer − drums
Don Elliott, Emil Richards − percussion

References

1967 soundtrack albums
Quincy Jones albums